Moeris is a genus of skippers in the family Hesperiidae.

Species
Recognised species in the genus Moeris include:
 Moeris anna (Mabille, 1898)
 Moeris striga (Geyer, 1832)
 Moeris stroma Evans, 1955

References

Natural History Museum Lepidoptera genus database

Hesperiinae
Hesperiidae genera